Kotagiri plantations were first planted by M. D. Cockburn in 1843. 
Soon after, regular planting commenced and several plantations were opened. But planting seems to have been around for years before that. Several small attempts were made around the area, with Pope and Magrath opening in Kotagiri, M.D.Cockburn on the Kotagiri ghat, his son George Cockburn in Kotagiri, and Bannerman and Haldwell in Totapolliam.

The first tea plantation however owes its existence to a lady, the daughter of M.D.Cockburn, who opened an estate in 1863, followed by Kodanad. Tea soon took over, and coffee growing was given up. There was a steady growth of tea planting. By the end of the 19th century, it was in around 3000 acres (12 km2), and today it is almost 30,000 acres (120 km2).

References
Planting in Nilgiris, 1966 (NPA souvenir)

See also
 The Plantation story

Tea industry in Tamil Nadu
Tea estates in India
Tourist attractions in Nilgiris district